Queen Charlotte was built in France and taken in prize c.1781, probably on the Jamaica Station. She first appeared in British on-line records first as a privateer and then a transport. She was last listed in 1783.

Queen Charlotte first appeared in Lloyd's Register (LR) in 1781.

Citations

1780s ships
Ships built in France
Captured ships
Privateer ships of Great Britain
Age of Sail merchant ships of England